Meridian, also known as Meridian: Kiss of the Beast, The Ravaging and Phantoms, is a 1990 American romantic horror film produced and directed by Charles Band and starring Sherilyn Fenn, Malcolm Jamieson, Hilary Mason and Charlie Spradling.

Plot summary
Catherine Bomarzini and her best friend Gina have traveled to Catherine's family castle in Italy after her father's death. Once there, the two visit a local carnival, where Gina invites the head magician Lawrence and his crew to the castle for dinner. At the dinner Lawrence drugs both women and rapes Gina in front of his crew. He then carries Catherine off to another room where he strips and begins to seduce her, but pulls away so his twin brother Oliver can instead have sex with her. As the film progresses Catherine finds that both brothers are under a curse - they can only die at the hands of a loved one.

Cast
 Sherilyn Fenn (Catherine Bomarzini)
 Malcolm Jamieson (Lawrence/Oliver)
 Hilary Mason (Martha)
 Charlie Spradling (Gina)
 Alex Daniels (Beast)
 Phil Fondacaro (Circus Dwarf)
 Vernon Dobtcheff (Village Priest)
 Isabella Celani (Castle Ghost)

Release
Meridian was released to video in the United States on April 13, 1990. It has received several DVD releases and in 2016 Full Moon released a re-mastered version of the film, which they re-titled The Ravaging.

The film's soundtrack was released in 1992 through Moonstone Records. Allmusic gave the soundtrack two stars, as they felt that it was not among Pino Donaggio's best work.

Reception 
Matt Serafini heavily criticized the film in a 2010 review for Dread Central, commenting that while he had previously listed the movie as one of his favorites, Meridian did not hold up under further viewings, as it was "as poorly written and sloppily made as anything in their recent output". Allmovie panned the movie and gave it 1 1/2 stars.

References

External links

 

1990 films
1990 horror films
American erotic romance films
Films directed by Charles Band
Films scored by Pino Donaggio
Fratricide in fiction
American erotic horror films
1990s English-language films
1990s American films